Henderson King Yoakum (September 6, 1810 – November 30, 1856) was a Texas historian.

He was born in Claiborne County, Tennessee, and graduated from West Point in 1832. Yoakum served in the Tennessee Senate from 1839 to 1845 and strongly advocated for the annexation of Texas. Yoakum served as the director of the state penitentiary in Huntsville, Texas, beginning in 1849. As an attorney Yoakum drafted the charter for Austin College in 1849.

In 1846, Yoakum authored a two-volume work titled History of Texas from Its First Settlement in 1685 to Its Annexation to the United States in 1846. An 1805-1819 map of Spanish Texas is found at the front of the text.

Yoakum County, Texas, established in 1876, was named after him.

References

External links
 
Map of Spanish Texas

1810 births
1856 deaths
United States Military Academy alumni
19th-century American historians
19th-century American male writers
Tennessee state senators
People from Claiborne County, Tennessee
Yoakum County, Texas
19th-century American politicians
American male non-fiction writers